Power Surge is a high-impact thrill ride designed by Italian ride manufacturer Zamperla. The Power Surge was first operated in 1999, and is produced in both trailer-mounted and park versions. Zamperla recommends that riders be 48 inches (122 cm) or taller; however, 52 inches (132 cm) is more common.

Design and operation

Six fixed arms are connected in an asterisk pattern, with two sets of two seats attached at right angles to the arms. The arm assembly is connected to a main arm. Twenty-four riders at a time can be loaded onto the ride. Riders are restrained by an over-the-shoulder harness, with their legs dangling free for excitement.

When this ride is activated, multiple movements occur. The arm assembly rotates, the main arm is raised from the stationary position to an angle of approximately seventy degrees from the horizontal. Once this height is reached, the main arm is capable of rotating, with the combined rotations of both sections causing the seat sets to swing and rotate around the point of attachment. The rotating components can move in both clockwise and anti-clockwise directions, and the different movements can be activated in isolation of each other.

The trailer version of the ride fits onto a standard road trailer, and can be assembled or racked in approximately 2 hours by two people.

Appearances

 Australia - Three; a park model at Adventure World, and a trailer model operated by SideShow Amusements and one at Luna Park Melbourne.
 The Bahamas - The Holiday Carnival hosts this ride.
 Colombia - At least one; at Mundo Aventura (renamed Ikaro).
 Finland - Särkänniemi amusement park, park model.
 Indonesia - At least two; a park model (renamed as Kicir-kicir - meaning "wind mill" in Indonesian) at Dunia Fantasi, Ancol, and Trans Studio Bandung.
 Ireland- Emerald Park
 New Zealand - At least one; a park model at Rainbow's End.
 Saudi Arabia - At least two; one in Alshallal Theme Park, Jeddah, and one in Jungle land.
 United Kingdom - At least one; a trailer model operated by Darren Noble (Returned to the UK for the start of the 2020 season, operated for around a month before it was sold to a showman in the Netherlands).
 United States of America - At least six; at Knoebels, Wild Adventures, Spokane Public Theme Park, 2016: Beech Bend Park, and Coney Island Astroland (2001) then Luna Park (2010); Palace Playland also traveling ones with the Mighty Bluegrass Shows, Reithoffer Shows and Burton Brothers Amusements most recent installation at frontier city in Oklahoma, opened in 2016 named “gun slinger”

References

Amusement rides
Upside-down amusement rides
Amusement rides introduced in 1999
Zamperla